Steven Brill (born May 27, 1962) is an American actor, film producer, director, and screenwriter. He directed and co-wrote Little Nicky and directed Mr. Deeds, Without a Paddle, Heavyweights, and Drillbit Taylor. He has had cameo roles in all three Mighty Ducks movies, and appeared in The Wedding Singer, Mr. Deeds, and Knocked Up, although his role in the latter has been miscredited to Judd Apatow. He also appeared as the Barfly in Sex, Lies, and Videotape.

As a director, Brill was one of the central players (alongside Harvey Weinstein) in the 2007/2008 Fanboys reshoot/editing controversy.

Education
Steven Brill attended high school (1976–1980) in Fort Lauderdale, Florida. Brill graduated from Boston University's Film School. There he studied with poet Derek Walcott and collaborated with Marc Maron on screenplays and standup comedy during a tumultuous formative period discussed on the 500th episode of WTF with Marc Maron.

Filmography

TV movies

Acting roles

References

External links

American male film actors
Film producers from New York (state)
American male screenwriters
American male television actors
Comedy film directors
Television producers from New York (state)
Boston University College of Fine Arts alumni
Film directors from New York (state)
Male actors from New York (state)
Writers from Utica, New York
1962 births
Living people
Screenwriters from New York (state)